The Laysan fan palm is a not formally described, extinct species of palm most likely in the genus Pritchardia. Endemic to the island of Laysan, it had become extinct by 1896.

History
The palm was first accounted in 1828 by early visitors to Laysan island. Karl Izembek, surgeon of the Russian ship Moller, was the first to write of the species. In 1859, there was an account of 5 mature individuals remaining.

By the time Hugo Schauinsland visited in 1896, all the palms had been killed. He blamed human activity, citing evidence of palm wood in charcoal. He noticed many remaining stumps, alluding to a population of several hundred decades before. Evidence of the palms was last observed in 1914 as "decaying remains".

Description
The palms were known to be up to 15 feet tall. Schauinsland noticed stumps with a diameter up to 50 cm. He was told that the palms had huge fan-shaped leaves, long inflorescences, and long fruit racemes, leading to him identifying it as a Pritchardia. The species was once widespread on the island. Dense forests were hypothesized to exist based on historic palynology.

Few photos of the palms are known to exist, and they are not of sufficient quality to allow for identification. No physical collections are known to exist. Based on the photographic evidence, it has been suggested that the species was identical to Pritchardia remota (Nihoa fan palm). Another theory is that the Laysan fan palm was a separate species. This is supported by George Campbell Munro, an observer of both the Laysan fan palm and the Nihoa fan palm, who claimed they were distinct. Pritchardia species are also known to be highly localized, which also supports the theory that the Laysan fan palm was a separate species.

References

Pritchardia
Extinct flora of Hawaii
Undescribed plant species